Wisoot Bunpeng (born 10 January 1988), simply known as Da, is a Thai retired professional footballer. He was the runner-up of Pepsi World Challenge 2006 with Anawin Jujeen. He had a short spell at Indian I-League club Viva Kerala in 2009. After first phase of the league, he was released due to injury.

Bunpeng played international football for Thailand at under-18 and under-19 levels.

Honours
Ubon UMT United
Regional League Division 2: 2015
Regional League North-East Division: Runner-up 2015

References

 
 
 
 

Bunpeng, Wisoot
Bunpeng, Wisoot
Bunpeng, Wisoot
Thai expatriate sportspeople in India
Wisoot Bunpeng
Wisoot Bunpeng
Wisoot Bunpeng
Wisoot Bunpeng
Wisoot Bunpeng
Wisoot Bunpeng
Bunpeng, Wisoot